Stabel is a surname which is commonly seen in Norway. It may refer to:

 Carl Ludovico Stabel (1912 – 1988), Norwegian civil servant and judge 
 Fredrik Stabel (1914 – 2001), Norwegian illustrator and writer 
 Hans Jacob Stabel (1769 – 1836), Norwegian priest 
 Ingse Stabel (born 1946), Norwegian judge 
 Melanie Stabel (born 1999), German deaf sport shooter 
 Pierre Jean Van Stabel (1744 – 1797), French naval officer